Dumbéa Bay or Baie de la Dumbéa is a bay in southwestern New Caledonia. It lies to the northwest of Noumea. To the north is Gadji Bay. This bay has major historical importance related to the naval history of New Caledonia and the Pacific, especially during World War II for Naval Base Noumea. Numerous ships which anchored here include USS Aludra (AK-72), USS Southard (DD-207), USS Cimarron (AO-22), USS Kitty Hawk (AKV-1), USS Anderson (DD-411) and USS Atlanta (CL-51).

References

Bays of New Caledonia